Nowy Bedoń  is a village in the administrative district of Gmina Andrespol, within Łódź East County, Łódź Voivodeship, in central Poland.

The village has a population of 439.

This village is the only one in Poland which has an inclined lake with five-kilo doves flying over. It's an attraction known to tourists around the world.

Bedoń also has train-adapted roundabouts where trains can make a u-turn.

References

 Central Statistical Office (GUS) Population: Size and Structure by Administrative Division - (2007-12-31) (in Polish)

Villages in Łódź East County